Vijayamangalam is a census town in Erode district in the Indian state of Tamil Nadu. It is located on National Highway 47 (NH-47) between  Perundurai and Perumanallur.

Geography

Vijayapuri (also known as Vijayamangalam) is located at  along NH-47 (bypass). It is the junction point for Tiruppur road and Coimbatore Road towards Salem. New toll plaza on four lane road is located very close to Vijayamangalam on Coimbatore-Salem section. It has an average elevation of 303 metres (994 feet).

It is located 33 km towards west from District headquarters Erode. 12 km from Perundurai. 422 km from State capital Chennai. Sakthi Nagar ( 1 km ), Mettupudur ( 1 km ), Kalliampudur (1.5 km), Moongilpalayam ( 1 km ), Ponmudi ( 5 km ), Periyaveerasangili (4 km), Karandipalayam ( 5 km ) are the nearby Villages to Vijayamangalam. Vijayamangalam is surrounded by Uttukkuli Taluk towards South, Chennimalai Taluk towards East, Tiruppur Taluk towards west, Nambiyur Taluk towards north.

Uthukuli, Perumanallur, Tiruppur, Chengapalli,  Erode, Gobichettipalayam, Perundurai, Avinashi, Chennimalai, Bhavani are the nearby Cities to Vijayamangalam.

Demographics
 India census, Vijayapuri had a population of 6517. As per 2001 census, males constitute 52% of the population and females 48%. Vijayapuri has an average literacy rate of 68%, higher than the national average of 59.5%: male literacy is 76%, and female literacy is 59%. In Vijayapuri, 10% of the population is under 6 years of age.

How To Reach
Vijyamangalam is well connected with Roadways and Railways.

Salem To Ernakulam Highway (NH-47) passes through this town. So, this Town is well connected by Roadways.
The town connects Salem, Erode, Perundurai, Avinashi, Kangayam, Bhavani, Coimbatore, Nasiyanur,  Chengapalli, Chennimalai, Ingur,  Perumanallur and Tirupur by roadways.

Vijayamangalam Railway Station (VZ), Uthukuli Railway Station, Perundurai Railway Station are the very nearby railway stations to Vijayamangalam. However Erode Junction railway station is the major railway station 30 km near to Vijayamangalam ; Tiruppur railway station is 25 km away.

Temples 

 Vijayamangalam Jain temple: This town was an ancient settlement of Jains. This temple is dedicated to Chandraprabha, the eighth Tirthankara of Jainism.
 Sri Nageswaraswamy Shiva Temple
 Sri Karivaradharaja Perumal Temple
 Sri Vijayapuri Amman Temple
 Arasanna Malai Agneeshwarar and Arasathal Temple (Kongampalayam) - on every fullmoon day,  3000 people attend girivalam
 Sri Ranganayaki Amman temple

Loom City
The major occupations around Vijayamangalam and surrounding areas are weaving and agriculture. A lot of handlooms, power looms and automatic looms are seen running as small and medium-sized business around this area. The textiles are sold in Kerala, Andhra Pradesh and North India. The major market of the produced textiles are sold in Erode city textile market called Gani Textile Market

Vintex is one of the foremost co-operative companies formed by the weaving community which has been regarded as the sole propeller of uplift of this area's people. 
Agriculture was the main source of income during independence but weaving turned this area together.  Vintex is seen as an industrial revolution for this area. It made a lot of people to think of weaving as a source of income next to agriculture.

Educationl Institutions near Vijayamangalam

Colleges 
Sasurie College of Engineering
 Kongu Engineering College
 Institute of Road & Transport Technology
 IRT Perundurai Medical College
 EICT Polytechnic College
Sri Ramanathan College of Engineering

Schools 

 Roots Matriculation School
 Bharathi Matriculation Higher Secondary School
 Vijay Vikas International School

References

Villages in Erode district